Eugenio Bianchi is an Italian theoretical physicist and assistant professor at the Pennsylvania State University who works on loop quantum gravity and black hole thermodynamics. He has derived the Bekenstein-Hawking formula  for the entropy of non-extremal black holes from loop quantum gravity, for all values of the Immirzi parameter.

References

External links
Bianchi's home page at the Pennsylvania State University.

Loop quantum gravity researchers
Italian relativity theorists
1979 births
People from the Province of Benevento
Living people
Pennsylvania State University faculty